Pnigomantis is a genus of mantises in the family Mantidae. It is monotypic, being represented by the single species Pnigomantis medioconstricta common name Indonesian double shield mantis or double shield mantis.

Description
Adult males are about 79 millimeters in length while adult females are about 86 to 89 millimeters in length. The coloration is highly variable, and seemingly not related to environmental conditions. There are red bands in between the upper abdominal segments used in the threat display used to deter predators. The characteristic "double shield" appears roughly after the fifth instar, females have nine instars, while males have eight. The inside of the forearms is a light blue-purple color, with dark black markings on the lower arms to seemingly act as eyespots. Most adults will turn a grey color with slight checkering on the wings, two light spots are present on the forewings. The Pnigomantis also possesses two light "cheek" patches.

Range
Pnigomantis medioconstricta are endemic to the island of Flores off of Indonesia.

Captivity
Pnigomantis medioconstricta are kept in captivity. Breeding this species can be a slight challenge due to females being highly aggressive and the smaller number of males per ootheca. This species of mantid eats many invertebrates and vertebrates. This species is strongly built and very aggressive, and they often chase their prey. First instar nymphs readily take Drosophila hydei fruit flies, and graduate to much larger prey as they near adult. Adult females will occasionally take live mice.

Additional Images

References

Mantodea genera
Monotypic insect genera
Endemic fauna of Indonesia
Hierodulinae
Insects of Indonesia
Insects described in 1889
Taxa named by John O. Westwood